

The M&D Flugzeugbau AVo 68 Samburo is a two-seat motor glider, first designed and manufactured in Austria.

Design and development
The aircraft is of typical motorglider configuration, with a tractor propeller and long, tapering wings.  As originally designed, it also had a sailplane-like undercarriage consisting of a single mainwheel and a steerable tailwheel; however, later versions have a fixed taildragger undercarriage with two spatted mainwheels.  The pilot and passenger sit side by side. With numerous design changes - including modern Rotax engines, state-of-the-art avionics, and aerotow capabilities, it is still in production by the M&D Flugzeugbau company in Germany.

Variants
AVo 60 Samburo The initial prototype powered by a  Limbach engine.
AVo 68 Samburo Production aircraft powered by  Limbach engines.

Specifications (AVo 68-R 115)

References

 
 Manufacturer's website

Samburo
1970s Austrian sailplanes
Single-engined tractor aircraft
Low-wing aircraft
Motor gliders
Aircraft first flown in 1977